Albergoni may refer to: 

 Villa Albergoni, a residence in Moscazzano, Lombardy, Italy
 Palazzo Arrigoni Albergoni, a residence in Crema, Lombardy, Italy
 Attilio Albergoni (born 1949), Italian military researcher and writer
 Albergoni family, a noble family from Italy

See also
 Alberoni (disambiguation)

Italian-language surnames